Esker (also Romanized as ‘Askar; also known as ‘Asgar) is a village in Rabor Rural District, in the Central District of Rabor County, Kerman Province, Iran. At the 2006 census, its population was 2,080, in 494 families.

References 

Populated places in Rabor County